Parc des Sports Michel Hidalgo is a multi-use stadium in Sannois, France.  It is currently used mostly for football matches and is the home stadium of Entente SSG. The stadium is able to hold 8,000 people.

References

Michel Hidalgo
Entente SSG
Sports venues in Val-d'Oise